HomeStop is a home furnishing store based in Mumbai, which offers home products such as decor, furniture, and accessories. HomeStop is part of the Shoppers Stop group. The goods sold in this store are often imported.

Products

Homestop carries products from domestic and international brands such as Soulflower, Portico, Spaces, Spirella, Interdesign, Blue Water, Progressive, Norpro, Umbra, Trideau, Joseph & Joseph, OXO, Lock & Lock, Corelle, Wham, Whitmore, Pasabache, Luminarc, Lucaris, and Bohemia Philips.

Products available include home decor, furniture, bath accessories, bedroom furnishings, mattresses, draperies, carpets, modular kitchens, body spa, aromatic products, and health equipment.

Store Locations

HomeStop is currently located in 15 Indian cities including Bengaluru, Coimbatore, Mumbai, Delhi, Navi Mumbai and Chennai

See also 
 List of department stores by country
 Department store

References

External links 
 Official Website
 HomeStop Page

Companies based in Mumbai
India
Indian companies established in 2005
2005 establishments in Maharashtra
Retail companies established in 2005